Mayday "Dean" Trippe is a United States-based comic book artist and illustrator. Trippe graduated from the Savannah College of Art and Design with a B.F.A. in Sequential Art in 2003.

Work

Trippe's early published work includes contributions to several comic anthologies, including You Ain't No Dancer and the 2005 FLUKE Anthology, as well as coloring for various publishers, including Viper Comics' The Middleman and Oni Press's Ghost Projekt. Their primary work to date is the webcomic Butterfly.

Along with Jamie Dee Galey, Trippe was also one of the instigators of the 2005 Batgirl Livejournal Meme, which grew into a phenomenon of over 1000 artists contributing their own unique renditions of DC Comics' Batgirl.

Trippe is known for their stylish redesigns of popular American superhero characters. With writer Chris Arrant, they co-founded Project: Rooftop, a website devoted to original redesigns of classic American comic book characters.

Trippe collaborated with fellow comics creator Jason Horn on the short story, "Merman," for Image Comics' Comic Book Tattoo, the Eisner and Harvey Award-winning anthology graphic novel inspired by the songs of musician Tori Amos. Trippe's later published the graphic novel Power Lunch: Book 1: First Course, with writer J. Torres, for Oni Press.

Trippe started a Kickstarter campaign in 2014 to publish Something Terrible, an autobiographical comic about child abuse and sexual violence. The work was distributed by Iron Circus Comics.

In September 2015, Trippe illustrated the cover of the scientific journal Nature, in which he designed a team of superheroes representing areas of knowledge (economics, psychology, astronomy, quantum mechanics, medicine, computer science, and Evolutionary biology) that also is used in an editorial and a special issue. Trippe also illustrated a variant for another article within the issue.

Private life
Trippe came out as non-binary in 2021.

They are a member of the Democratic Socialists of America.

Bibliography
 Something Terrible Comic autobiography of Dean Trippe and their struggles. Self-published.
 Power Lunch Book 1: First Course (with writer J. Torres, Oni Press, 2011)
 Knock Knock Joke of the book with Paul and Jack short story in Yo Gabba Gabba: Comic Book Time! (Oni Press, 2011)
 Butterfly, a superhero parody webcomic
 Merman Short Story in Comic Book Tattoo (with Jason Horn, Image Comics, 2008)
 Wake, a serialized webcomic for Act-i-vate
 Butterfly Origin in Superior Showcase #1 (AdHouse Books, 2006)
 Untitled short story in You Ain't No Dancer, Vol. 1 (New Reliable Press, 2005)
 Untitled short story in 2005 FLUKE Anthology

References

External links
 

Living people
American comics artists
American comics writers
American webcomic creators
LGBT comics creators
Members of the Democratic Socialists of America
Non-binary artists
Year of birth missing (living people)